The Castillo San Felipe de Barajas (San Felipe de Barajas Castle) is a fortress in the city of Cartagena, Colombia. The castle was built in 1536 and is located on the Hill of San Lázaro in a strategic location, dominating approaches to the city by land or sea. It was originally known as the Castillo de San Lázaro. It was built by African slave labor under Spanish supervision during the colonial era. The fortress was involved in several battles between the late 17th to early 19th centuries between European powers.

History
Construction on the fortress was finalised by 1536 and expanded between 1639 and 1657. It was built in a triangular shape on top of a hill, with eight batteries and a garrison of 200 soldiers and 4 gunners. Its name was given in honour of Philip IV of Spain.

In the 1697 raid on Cartagena, during the War of the Grand Alliance, the castle fell to the French privateer Baron de Pointis. The castle was repaired by José de Herrera y Sotomayor in 1739. British Admiral Edward Vernon attacked the fortress in the 1741 Battle of Cartagena de Indias, an important conflict of the War of Jenkins' Ear. Vernon's forces were repelled by the Spanish admiral Blas de Lezo. Another expansion was made to the fortress in 1763 by Antonio de Arévalo.

During the Spanish American wars of independence by 1815 a large Spanish expeditionary force under Pablo Morillo had arrived in New Granada. Cartagena fell in December, and by May 1816 the royalists had control of all of New Granada.

The castle

The fortification consists of a series of walls, wide at the base and narrow toward the parapet, forming a formidable pattern of bunkers. The batteries and parapets protect one another, so making it practically impossible to take a battery without taking the whole defence system.
The castle is striking for its grand entrance and its complex maze of tunnels. It is the most formidable defensive complex of Spanish military architecture. It is 41 meters (135 ft.) above sea level.

Key features include the triangular Castillo de San Felipe de Barajas, surrounded by the batteries de Santa Barbara, de San Carlos y Los Apostles, Del Hornabeque, de la Cruz, de la Redencion, and de San Lazaro.  The combined 68 guns faced away from the city.  Joining the Media Luna causeway was a caponniere.  The San Lazaro battery's terreplein included aljibes, while channels and breakwaters dealt with rainwater.  The main underground gallery runs along the perimeter of the complex at sea level.  Chambers within it could be exploded preventing the advance of overhead attackers.

Status and conservation
The castle is not well preserved. When it ceased to be used for military purposes, tropical vegetation covered the battlements and walls, and soil accumulated in the tunnels and trenches.
In 1984, UNESCO listed the castle, along with the historic centre of the city of Cartagena, as a World Heritage Site.

Since 1990, the castle has served as a location for social and cultural events offered by the Colombian government in honour of foreign delegations at presidential summits, ministerial meetings, the Summit of the Non-Aligned Movement (1995) and the Summit of the Rio Group (2000), among others.
The castle is open to visitors, but only some of the tunnels are open to viewing.

See also
List of colonial buildings in Cartagena, Colombia

References

Buildings and structures in Cartagena, Colombia
Spanish colonial fortifications in Cartagena, Colombia
Tourist attractions in Cartagena, Colombia
Forts in Colombia